Lake Street Historic District may refer to:

Lake Street Historic District (Bergen, New York), listed on the National Register of Historic Places in Genesee County
Lake Street Historic District (Waupaca, Wisconsin), listed on the National Register of Historic Places in Waupaca County, Wisconsin